The 2019 Philippine Basketball Association (PBA) Governors' Cup Finals was the best-of-7 championship series of the 2019 PBA Governors' Cup, and the conclusion of the conference's playoffs. The Barangay Ginebra San Miguel and the Meralco Bolts competed for the 19th Governors' Cup championship and the 127th overall championship contested by the league.

This was third time that Barangay Ginebra and Meralco competed for the Governors' Cup championship in the span of four seasons. Barangay Ginebra won the two previous championships against Meralco in 2016 and 2017.

Due to the adjustments done in the season calendar to give way for the preparations of the Philippines men's national basketball team for the 2019 FIBA Basketball World Cup and the Philippines' hosting of the 2019 Southeast Asian Games, the finals series started on January 7, 2020.

Background

Road to the finals

Head-to-head matchup

Series summary

Game summaries

Game 1

Game 2

Game 3

Game 4

Game 5

Rosters

{| class="toccolours" style="font-size: 95%; width: 100%;"
|-
! colspan="2" style="background-color: #; color: #; text-align: center;" | Barangay Ginebra San Miguel 2019 PBA Governors' Cup roster
|- style="background-color:#; color: #; text-align: center;"
! Players !! Coaches
|-
| valign="top" |
{| class="sortable" style="background:transparent; margin:0px; width:100%;"
! Pos. !! # !! POB !! Name !! Height !! Weight !! !! College 
|-

  Also serves as Barangay Ginebra's board governor.

{| class="toccolours" style="font-size: 95%; width: 100%;"
|-
! colspan="2" style="background-color: #; color: #; text-align: center;" | Meralco Bolts 2019 PBA Governors' Cup roster
|- style="background-color:#; color: #; text-align: center;"
! Players !! Coaches
|-
| valign="top" |
{| class="sortable" style="background:transparent; margin:0px; width:100%;"
! Pos. !! # !! POB !! Name !! Height !! Weight !! !! College 
|-

Broadcast notes
The Philippine Cup Finals was aired on TV5 with simulcasts on PBA Rush (both in standard and high definition). 5's radio arm, Radyo5 provided the radio play-by-play coverage. 

ESPN5 also provided online livestreaming via the PBA's official Facebook account using the TV5 feed.

The PBA Rush broadcast provided English-language coverage of the Finals.

Additional Game 5 crew:
Trophy presentation: James Velazquez
Dugout celebration interviewer: Lyn Olavario

References

External links
PBA official website

2019
2019 PBA season
Barangay Ginebra San Miguel games
Meralco Bolts games
PBA Governors' Cup Finals